Charlotte Thompson may refer to:

Charlotte Thompson Reid (1913–2007), U.S. Congresswoman
Charlotte Small (1785–1857), wife of explorer David Thompson 
Charlotte Thompson (playwright) (1884–1919), adapter of Rebecca of Sunnybrook Farm